Weeford is a civil parish in the district of Lichfield, Staffordshire, England.  The parish contains eight listed buildings that are recorded in the National Heritage List for England.  All the listed buildings are designated at Grade II, the lowest of the three grades, which is applied to "buildings of national importance and special interest".  The parish includes the village of Weeford and the surrounding countryside.  The buildings in Weeford House Farm were at one time part of a large coach staging complex,  and some of them are listed.  The other listed buildings are a church, a farmhouse, and two lodges.


Buildings

References

Citations

Sources

Lichfield District
Lists of listed buildings in Staffordshire